Horizon Air, a regional airline based in SeaTac, Washington, serves 47 different destinations in the western United States, Canada and Mexico. Horizon Air's inaugural destinations in 1981 were Pasco, Seattle, and Yakima, Washington which were served with two wet leased Fairchild F-27 turboprop aircraft. In 1982, Horizon Air expanded into Oregon with a purchase of Air Oregon, and added service to seven new destinations. One year later, Horizon acquired Transwestern Airlines of Utah and then expanded into the intermountain West region of the United States. Five of the seven routes introduced with the acquisition of Air Oregon are still served by Horizon, with the exceptions of North Bend/Coos Bay, Oregon and by December 2008, Pendleton, Oregon. In 2008, Horizon restructured existing routes in order to transition to an all Bombardier Q400 fleet, removing the smaller Q200 turboprops as well as the CRJ-700 regional jets from the fleet.

One destination, Pendleton, Oregon, was subsidized through the Essential Air Service program, but on December 1, 2008, Horizon Air no longer served Pendleton. This change was brought mainly in part by the fleet transition plan, as Pendleton was served by the smaller Q200 plane, which was phased out of service. Horizon Air launched its first Mexican route, flying a CRJ-700 between Loreto, Mexico and Los Angeles, California in January 2008. Horizon has been flying to Canada since at least 1993, when service was added from Bellingham and Seattle to Calgary, Alberta.

On May 14, 2011, several routes that were formerly served by Horizon Air were transferred to SkyWest Airlines, operating under the name Alaska SkyWest.  SkyWest is operating five CRJ-700s purchased from Horizon Air under a capacity purchase agreement.  This means that SkyWest owns and operates the aircraft, while Alaska Airlines is responsible for marketing and selling tickets for the flights.  The CRJ-700s are operating on routes that would not be feasible to operate with neither Bombardier Q400s nor Boeing 737s.

On March 3, 2014, Horizon Air began daily flights from Anchorage to Fairbanks and Kodiak. The single daily flight to Kodiak is a seasonal service operated throughout the winter, while the Fairbanks flights replaced previous Alaska Airlines 737 service.

Destinations

Notes

References

Lists of airline destinations
Oneworld affiliate destinations